Georgi Radev (Bulgarian: Георги Радев; born 15 September 1994) is a Bulgarian footballer who plays as a defender for Litex.

Career
On 3 June 2016 Radev rejoined his youth team Cherno More from Sozopol for undisclosed fee, but on 20 July was released and subsequently returned to Sozopol.  On 13 December 2016, Radev was released by Sozopol. A few days later, he joined Tsarsko Selo Sofia.

In June 2018, Radev returned to his hometown club Dobrudzha Dobrich.

On 20 January 2020, Dordoi Bishkek announced the signing of Radev on a one-year contract.

In June 2022, he joined Litex Lovech.

References

External links
 

1994 births
Living people
Bulgarian footballers
Bulgaria youth international footballers
First Professional Football League (Bulgaria) players
Second Professional Football League (Bulgaria) players
PFC Cherno More Varna players
PFC Dobrudzha Dobrich players
FC Lyubimets players
FC Sozopol players
FC Tsarsko Selo Sofia players
Neftochimic Burgas players
PFC Spartak Varna players
Association football central defenders
People from Dobrich